Dolgoma reticulata is a moth of the family Erebidae. It is found in the Himalayas.

References

Moths described in 1878
Dolgoma